This is a list of longest prison sentences ever given to a single person, worldwide. Listed are instances where people have been sentenced to jail terms in excess of a human lifetime, but effectively the same purpose. Note that many national legislations worldwide do not allow for such sentences.

Since the sentence given is not necessarily equivalent to time served, see the list of longest prison sentences served for those who have spent the longest continuous time in prison.

Out of the 18 listed prisoners who were sentenced to more than one life imprisonment or to life imprisonment plus additional time, 14 of them were in the United States.

Prisoners sentenced to life imprisonment

Prisoners not sentenced to life imprisonment 
These sentences differ technically from sentences of life imprisonment in that the designated jail times have specific lengths, although in practical terms they effectively serve the same purpose.

Prisoners sentenced to 1,000 years or more in prison

Prisoners sentenced to between 500 and 1000 years in prison

Prisoners sentenced to between 120 and 499 years in prison

False claims

See also 
List of longest prison sentences served
List of prisoners with whole-life orders

References 

Lists of prisoners and detainees
Prisoners sentenced to life imprisonment
Penal imprisonment
Life imprisonment
Prison sentences